Totten House is a historic home and national historic district located at Lancaster Township, Lancaster County, Pennsylvania. The district encompasses two contributing buildings and two contributing structures. It was built between 1913 and 1916 as a private residence, and has  stories, stuccoed dwelling in the Spanish Revival style. It is now run as a bed and breakfast, known as the King's Cottage.

It was listed on the National Register of Historic Places in 1989.

References

External links
King's Cottage website

Houses on the National Register of Historic Places in Pennsylvania
Historic districts on the National Register of Historic Places in Pennsylvania
Houses completed in 1916
Houses in Lancaster County, Pennsylvania
National Register of Historic Places in Lancaster County, Pennsylvania